Blood Bunny is the second album by YouTuber and singer-songwriter Chloe Moriondo, released on May 7, 2021. Although many songs include co-writers, Moriondo is featured as a writer on every song on the album. "Manta Rays", "I Want To Be With You", "GIRL ON TV", and "I Eat Boys" were released as singles from the album. On June 10, 2022, Moriondo released Blood Bunny (Deluxe), a deluxe version of the album, including fan favorite song "Hell Hounds" and a new collaboration with dodie (singer) in "I Eat Boys (feat. dodie)." The track "Hell Hounds" was later also released with the singer-songwriter's third album SUCKERPUNCH.

Track listing 

Notes
 Girl on TV titles are stylized in all uppercase.
 The titles of track 20-23 are stylized in all lowercase.

References

2021 albums
Pop albums by American artists